Jeremy Donougher (born 28 November 1969) is an Australian former professional rugby league footballer who played at club level for the South Sydney Rabbitohs and the Bradford Bulls.

Career
Donougher made his first grade debut for South Sydney in round 2 of the 1993 season against Manly at Brookvale Oval.  Donougher played for Souths in their upset 1994 Tooheys Challenge Cup final victory over Brisbane.

Donougher joined Bradford in December 1995. In 1996, he scored a hat trick of tries for the club against Castleford, and played in the 1996 Challenge Cup Final defeat against St. Helens. He missed out on the cup final rematch a year later due to injury.

References

External links
Statistics at stats.rleague.com

1969 births
Living people
Australian rugby league players
Bradford Bulls players
South Sydney Rabbitohs players
Rugby league props
Rugby league second-rows